Victoria Plains may refer to:

Shire of Victoria Plains, a local government area in the Wheatbelt region of Western Australia

Victoria Plains, name of the former post and telegraph offices at New Norcia, Western Australia
Victoria Plains, Queensland, a rural locality in Queensland, Australia

Victoria Plains tropical savanna, an ecoregion in northwestern Australia

See also

 Ord Victoria Plain, an interim Australian bioregion in the Northern Territory and Western Australia